This is a list of the 53 Major League Baseball (MLB) players who have hit a home run in their final major league at bat (through the 2019 season).
Paul Gillespie and John Miller are the only players in MLB history to hit home runs in their first and last big league at bats. Mickey Cochrane and Ted Williams are the only players on this list that are in the Hall of Fame.

Bobby Kielty and David Ross both hit their final home runs in a World Series game. Kielty hit his in the series-clinching Game 4 of the 2007 World Series. Ross's occurred in Game 7 of the 2016 World Series and was an important contribution to ending the 108 year title drought of the Chicago Cubs.

Key

Players who hit home runs in their final at bat

See also

 List of Major League Baseball players with a home run in their first major league at bat

Sources
Baseball Almanac

Home run
Major League Baseball statistics